Rudnik  is a surname. Notable people with the surname include:

 Barbara Rudnik (1958–2009), German actress
 Eugeniusz Rudnik (1932–2016), Polish composer, electronics engineer, and sound engineer
 Jakob Rudnik (1894–1963), Ukrainian communist
 Raphael Rudnik (1933–2009), American poet